Elson Quincy Hooi (born 1 October 1991) is a Curaçaoan footballer who plays as a right winger for Al-Minaa and the Curaçao national team. He formerly played for NAC Breda, Viborg FF, FC Volendam, Ermis Aradippou, and Vendsyssel FF.

Career
He was raised in the Netherlands, but was born in Curaçao and represents the Curaçao national team. He won the 2017 Caribbean Cup with the Curaçao national team, and was also the top scorer of that competition.

Career statistics

International goals
As of match played 25 March 2021. Curaçao score listed first, score column indicates score after each Hooi goal.

Honours

Club
Viborg FF
Danish 1st Division: 2014–15

International
Curaçao
 Caribbean Cup: 2017
 King's Cup: 2019

References

External links
 
 

1991 births
Living people
Danish 1st Division players
Eredivisie players
Qatari Second Division players
NAC Breda players
Viborg FF players
Ermis Aradippou FC players
FC Volendam players
Vendsyssel FF players
ADO Den Haag players
Curaçao footballers
Curaçao expatriate footballers
Curaçao international footballers
Dutch footballers
Dutch expatriate footballers
Dutch people of Curaçao descent
Association football forwards
People from Willemstad
2017 CONCACAF Gold Cup players
2019 CONCACAF Gold Cup players
C.V.V. Inter Willemstad players
Expatriate footballers in Qatar
Dutch expatriate sportspeople in Qatar
Expatriate footballers in Kuwait
Dutch expatriate sportspeople in Kuwait
Kuwait Premier League players
Al Tadhamon SC players
Expatriate footballers in Iraq
Al-Mina'a SC players
Dutch expatriate sportspeople in Iraq